Wostok is a hamlet in Alberta, Canada within Lamont County.

History 
Wostok was founded in 1892 as a farming settlement of Slavic immigrants from the provinces of Galicia and Bukovina of Austria-Hungary.

Demographics 
Wostok recorded a population of 15 in the 1991 Census of Population conducted by Statistics Canada.

See also 
List of communities in Alberta
List of hamlets in Alberta

References 

Hamlets in Alberta
Lamont County